Sir Henry Pering Pellew Crease (20 August 1823 – 27 November 1905) was a British-Canadian lawyer, judge, and politician, influential in the colonies of Vancouver Island and British Columbia. He was the first Attorney General of the united Colony of British Columbia, and sat on the Supreme Court of that province for 26 years.

Early life

Crease was born at Ince Castle, in Cornwall, the son of a Royal Navy captain. He earned his BA from Clare College, Cambridge and then studied law at the Middle Temple. Though called to the bar in June 1849, he did not immediately pursue his career in law. Instead he joined his parents in an unsuccessful canal building endeavour in Upper Canada. After only a short turn as a barrister on his return to England, he took a job in Cornwall managing a tin mine owned by Great Wheal Vor United Mines, which ended with his employer suing him.

By the time Crease left again for Canada in April 1858, he had married Sarah Lindley and had three young daughters, Susan, Mary, and Barbara. Sarah was the daughter of the famous botanist, John Lindley. She was also a talented scientific illustrator and artist, and would go on to create many drawings and watercolours of early BC. Unable to find work in Toronto, Henry decided to try his luck in Victoria, and arrived there in December.

Lawyer and politician
Upon his arrival in Victoria, Crease was admitted as a barrister to the courts of Vancouver Island and British Columbia, becoming the first lawyer qualified to practice in both jurisdictions. Crease opened a practice in Victoria, sent for his family, and soon found himself travelling with Supreme Court Judge Matthew Baillie Begbie on his first circuit, dealing out justice on the frontier as a Crown prosecutor in the midst of the Gold Rush.

Politically, Crease presented himself as a foe of the Hudson's Bay Company's hegemony over the colony, and in 1860 was elected to the Vancouver Island House of Assembly as an independent member representing Victoria. However, he was soon criticised by the British Colonist (a paper run by opposition leader Amor de Cosmos) for being too cozy with the HBC-backed government. The following year, as if to prove de Cosmos right, governor Sir James Douglas appointed Crease Attorney-General of British Columbia, and Crease resigned his seat in the Assembly. He was a key member of the government, responsible for pushing literally hundreds of laws through the legislature, in between his continuing circuit tours, most of which was concerned with regulating the resource-based economic activity of the colony, including land settlement and gold mining. His legislation cemented his reputation as an advocate of free trade.

Even as a colonial pioneer, Crease clung to the aristocratic traditions of Britain. The Crease family's home in New Westminster was Ince Cottage, on Sapperton Road, named for the castle that belonged to Henry's mother's family in England. He sent his sons to Haileybury College in England for their schooling, and was dismayed to note that, "While you and I talk of the Old Country as 'Home,' all our children call Canada 'home.'"

When the colonies were joined in 1866 Crease became the first Attorney General of the united British Columbia. In 1868 the colonial capital was moved to Victoria, and the Creases moved with it. There they built a new home, Pentrelew, on Fort Street.

In Victoria, as in New Westminster, Crease was active in many community organisations: the Church of England, Royal Colonial Institute, and the Law Society of British Columbia, which he was key in founding. He sat on the board of the Colonial Securities Company, and was a lieutenant in the Seymour Artillery Company.

At a time when British policy called for North American colonies to extinguish native title by means of treaties, the British Columbia government, including Crease, made no effort to negotiate treaties. Indeed, when the issue was raised in the legislature in 1870, Attorney General Crease objected to the mere discussion of the issue as potentially damaging, "for Indians do get word of what's going on." In response to the criticism that the government had no Indian policy, Crease stated simply that "our policy has been, let the Indians alone."

BC Supreme Court judge
In 1870 he was appointed a judge of the Supreme Court of British Columbia and retired from his government post. Crease was suspicious of both Confederation and responsible government, largely because they threatened greater government control over judges and central Canadian domination of patronage. Like many British Columbians, he was disappointed that London seemed to have given up on BC as an independent colony, abandoning either it to annexation to the United States or confederation with Canada. "I believe that England is sick of her Colonies," he wrote, "and to be a Colonist, whatever your POSITION & CHARACTER when at Home – is to lose Caste the moment you become a bona fide settler."  Regardless of his opposition to Confederation, Crease was chosen to prepare for it as the chair of the Royal Commission for the Revision of Laws of BC.

After BC became a Canadian province in 1871, Crease devoted the next few years to fighting for judicial independence—specifically the right of judges to live outside their districts. In 1881 the BC Supreme Court, including Crease, ruled in the Thrasher case that the province's attempts to regulate judges were unconstitutional. This decision was overturned two years later by the Supreme Court of Canada.

In 1882, Crease presided over the trial of John Hall, who owned most of the land on Burrard Inlet that now makes up the community of Belcarra, British Columbia, and who was accused of murdering his mother in law. Hall and Crease had known each other for years, and Crease had once employed him as his agent in a dispute with trespassers who illegally logged on land he and his friend Robert Burnaby owned near Hall's ranch. Hall was found guilty of manslaughter, and his land signed over to his attorney to pay for his defence.

In 1884, Crease overturned the Chinese Population Regulation Bill, which imposed an annual tax of ten dollars on each Chinese over the age of ten. He ruled that the provincial government had acted beyond its constitutional authority in passing the act, which fell within federal powers of taxation. The next year, as a member of the Royal Commission on Chinese Immigration, Crease wrote that "The real fact is, and the more completely it is recognized the better, that we cannot do without a certain number of Chinese for manual labour and for domestic servants," but went on to warn that Chinese immigrants "will never assimilate with the Anglo-Saxon race, nor is it desirable that they should … They do not regard British Columbia as their home and when they die send their bones home to be buried in China."

Sitting on several Royal commissions, the Exchequer Court of Canada, and the BC Supreme Court, Crease remained an influential figure long after his defeat in the Thrasher case. However, federal Justice Minister Sir Charles Hibbert Tupper was not impressed with Crease's judgment toward the end of his career and pushed for Crease's retirement in a letter to BC Supreme Court Chief Justice Theodore Davie. Crease retired soon afterward in January 1896. On 23 January 1896 Crease was knighted. He died in 1905 and was buried at Ross Bay Cemetery in Victoria.

References

Sources
J. B. Kerr, "Crease, Henry Pering Pellew" in Biographical Dictionary of Well-known British Columbians: with a historical sketch (Vancouver: Kerr & Begg, 1890) p. 133

External links
Meet the Crease family at British Columbia Archives

1823 births
1905 deaths
Alumni of Clare College, Cambridge
Attorneys General of British Columbia
Judges in British Columbia
Lawyers in British Columbia
Canadian Knights Bachelor
English emigrants to pre-Confederation Canada
British emigrants to Canada
Canadian people of Cornish descent
Members of the Legislative Assembly of Vancouver Island
Politicians from Victoria, British Columbia
Members of the Middle Temple
Colony of British Columbia (1866–1871) judges
British colonial attorneys general in the Americas
Members of the Legislative Council of British Columbia